The Fernando Gil International Prize for the Philosophy of Science, named after the Portuguese philosopher Fernando Gil, is an award of the Portuguese government for "work of particular excellence in the domain of the Philosophy of Science, whether regarding general epistemological problems or particular scientific areas". It includes a monetary reward of €75 000.

Winners 
2010: Ladislav Kvasz (cs), Slovakia
2011: Niccolò Guicciardini, Italy
2013: Hasok Chang, United Kingdom
2015: Michael Friedman, United States
2017: Emily Grosholz, United States
2019: Adrian Currie, United Kingdom

External links 
 Official page

References 

Philosophy awards